The Bible makes reference to various pharaohs (Parʿō) of Egypt. These include unnamed pharaohs in events described in the Torah, as well as several later named pharaohs, some of whom were historical or can be identified with historical pharaohs.

Unnamed pharaohs

In the Book of Genesis

 tells of Abram moving to Egypt to escape a period of famine in Canaan. Abram worries that the unnamed pharaoh will kill him and take away his wife Sarai, so Abram tells her to say she is his sister. They are eventually summoned to meet the pharaoh, but God sends plagues against the pharaoh because of his intention to marry Sarai. After discovering that Sarai is Abram's wife, he releases her and orders Abram to take his belongings and return to Canaan.

The final chapters of the Book of Genesis tell how Joseph, son of Jacob, is sold by his brothers into Egyptian slavery, promoted by the unnamed pharaoh to vizier of Egypt, and later given permission to bring his father, his brothers, and their families into Egypt to live in the Land of Goshen (eastern Nile Delta around modern Faqus). Ahmed Osman argued that this pharaoh was Thutmose IV and identified Joseph as the Egyptian figure Yuya. Other scholars generally reject Osman's claims.

In the Book of Exodus

In the Book of Exodus, the Israelites—the descendants of Jacob's sons—are living in the Land of Goshen under a new pharaoh who oppresses the Hebrews. He forces them to work long hours, which includes building Pithom and Ramses, making mortar, and  baking bricks. He also issues a decree to kill their newborn males in order to reduce their numbers due to concerns about their growing population (Shiphrah and Puah briefly tries to prevent this with no avail). Moses, a Levite, is saved by his mother who instructs his sister Miriam to watch over him after he is placed in a reed basket in the Nile River. He is discovered and adopted by the pharaoh's daughter. Miriam asks the princess if she would like an Israelite woman to help nurse the child and returns with Moses' own mother, who is then able to raise her child under royal protection. During his infant years, Moses is instructed about the customs and history of the Israelites, and is taught about Yahweh. Later, Moses is returned to the pharaoh's daughter and raised as part of the royal household.

Though scholars generally do not recognize the biblical portrayal of the Exodus as an actual historical event, various historical pharaohs have been proposed as the corresponding ruler:
 Pepi I (24th - 23rd century BC): Emmanuel Anati has argued that the Exodus should be placed between the 24th and the 21st century BC and that Pepi I should be identified as the pharaoh of the Exodus. This theory has not gained acceptance and has received strong criticism from Israeli archaeologist Israel Finkelstein and American Egyptologist James K. Hoffmeier.
Dedumose II (died c. 1690 BC): David Rohl's 1995 A Test of Time revised Egyptian history by shortening the Third Intermediate Period of Egypt by almost 300 years. As a result, the synchronisms with the biblical narrative results in the Second Intermediate Period King Dedumose II the pharaoh of the Exodus. Rohl's revision has been turned down by the vast majority of Egyptologists.
 Ahmose I (1550–1525 BC): Several church fathers identified Ahmose I, who reconquered lower Egypt from the Hyksos, rulers of Asiatic (Semitic) origin, as the pharaoh of the Exodus, based on Herodotus, Manetho, Josephus and other classical authors’ identification of the Hyksos with the Hebrews.
Hatshepsut (1507–1458 BC). Diodorus Siculus identified the Jews with the Hyksos and identified the pharaoh of the Exodus with Queen Hatshepsut.
 Thutmose II (1493–1479 BC). Alfred Edersheim proposes in Old Testament Bible History that Thutmose II is best qualified to be the pharaoh of Exodus based on the fact that he had a brief, prosperous reign and then a sudden collapse with no legitimate son to succeed him. His widow Hatshepsut then became first regent (for Thutmose III, his son by his concubine Iset) before becoming pharaoh herself. Edersheim states that Thutmose II is the only pharaoh's mummy to display cysts, possible evidence of plagues that spread through the Egyptian and Hittite Empires at that time.
 Akhenaten (1353–1349 BC). In his book Moses and Monotheism, Sigmund Freud argued that Moses had been an Atenist priest of Akhenaten who was forced to leave Egypt, along with his followers, following the pharaoh's death. Eusebius identified the pharaoh of the Exodus with a king called "Acencheres", who may be identified with Akenhaten.
 Ramesses I (1292-1290 BC): Ahmed Osman identified Ramesses I as the pharaoh of the Exodus in his controversial argument about the identity of the Egyptian official Yuya. 
As such, he is often the pharaoh depicted in popular culture narratives of the event (such as the 1956 film The Ten Commandments and the 1998 animated film The Prince of Egypt). Although Ramesses II's late 13th Century BC stela in Beth Shan mentions two conquered peoples who came to "make obeisance to him" in his city of Raameses or Pi-Ramesses, the text mentions neither the building of the city nor, as some have written, the Israelites or Hapiru.
 Merneptah (c. 1213–1203 BC): Isaac Asimov in Guide to the Bible makes a case for Merneptah to be the pharaoh of the Exodus.
 Setnakhte (c. 1189–1186 BC): Igor P. Lipovsky and Israel Knohl make a case for Setnakhte to be the pharaoh of the Exodus.
Ramesses III (c. 1186–1155 BC): Gary A. Rendsburg, Baruch Halpern and Manfred Bietak make a case for Ramesses III as the pharaoh of the Exodus.
Bakenranef (c. 725-720 BC): Tacitus writes in his Histories that Bakenranef (whom he refers to as "Bocchoris") had expelled the Jews from Egypt because they suffered from a horrible disease and because he was instructed to do so by an oracle of the god Amun. Lysimachus of Alexandria, quoted by Josephus in Against Apion, also identifies the pharaoh of the Exodus with Bakenranef.
Ramses (?-?). Manetho and Chaeremon of Alexandria, both quoted by Josephus in Against Apion, state that the Jews were expelled from Egypt by a pharaoh named "Ramses", son of another pharaoh named "Amenophis". It is unclear which pharaoh this could be, since no pharaoh named Ramses had a predecessor named Amenophis.

In the Books of Kings 

In , it is narrated that to seal an alliance, the pharaoh of Egypt gave a daughter in marriage to Solomon. The same ruler later captured the city of Gezer and gave it to Solomon as well. No name is given for the pharaoh, and some hypotheses have been proposed:

 Siamun (c. 986–967 BC): is the most commonly proposed candidate for this role.
 Psusennes II (c. 967–943 BC): the Catholic Encyclopedia sees him as the best candidate.
 Shoshenq I (c. 943–922 BC): Edward Lipiński dated the destruction of Gezer to the late 10th century rather than earlier, and suggested that its conqueror was Shoshenq I of the 22nd Dynasty.

Conjectural pharaohs: Shishak and So
 and  sqq. tell of an invasion of Israel by Shishak, and a subsequent raid of Jerusalem and the Temple of Solomon. He is generally identified with Shoshenq I (943–922 BC).
 
2 Kings 17:4 says that king Hoshea sent letters to "So, King of Egypt". No pharaoh of this name is known for the time of Hoshea (about 730 BC), during which Egypt had three dynasties ruling contemporaneously: 22nd at Tanis, 23rd at Leontopolis, and 24th at Sais. Nevertheless, this ruler is commonly identified with Osorkon IV (730–715 BC) who ruled from Tanis, though it is possible that the biblical writer has mistaken the king with his city and equated So with Sais, at this time ruled by Tefnakht.

Historical pharaohs: Taharqa, Necho and Apries/Hophra

 and  mention a Tirhakah, king of Ethiopia (Kush), who the Bible says waged war against Sennacherib during the reign of King Hezekiah of Judah. Scholars have identified him as the pharaoh Taharqa. The events in the biblical account are believed to have taken place in 701 BC, whereas Taharqa came to the throne some ten years later. A number of explanations have been proposed: one being that the title of king in the Biblical text refers to his future royal title, when at the time of this account he was likely only a military commander.

Necho II is most likely the pharaoh mentioned in several books of the Bible. Jeremiah 44:30 mentions his successor Apries or Hophra (589–570 BC).

See also
 Ipuwer Papyrus
 Moses in Islam
 New Chronology (Rohl)
 Shiphrah 
 Thrasyllus of Mendes

References

Bibliography

 
Unnamed people of the Bible